Linnae Harper (born January 31, 1995) is an American professional basketball player who is currently a free agent.  She completed her college education at Ohio State University. She completed her high school education at Whitney M. Young High School in Chicago, Illinois. She has played on seven USA Basketball teams in Americas and world competition.

Early life
Harper was born on January 31, 1995, to Ericka Harper and Xavier Treadwell.

High school career
Harper played for Whitney M. Young High School for four years, winning the city title each year, and the Class 4A state championship in 2012. She was named a WBCA All-American, and participated in the 2013 WBCA High School All-America Game where she scored 8 points. She was also named a McDonald's All-American, and played in the McDonald's All-American game.

USA Basketball

3x3 U18 2011
The inaugural 3x3 U18 World Championship was held in 2011. The event, originally called the Youth World Championship, was held in Rimini, Italy. Harper was named to the team, along with teammates Kaela Davis, Rebecca Greenwell and Taya Reimer. The team won their first three matches easily, reaching 21 points before their opponent reached double-digits. Taya Reimer suffered an ankle injury in the game against Guam, and was unable to play in the remainder of the competition. Despite playing with three players, the USA team beat Italy by a score of 16–13. On the second day, the three remaining players won their first two games, then managed to beat the Czech Republic in two overtimes. They were now 7–0, and qualified for the medal rounds.

The semi-final was a rematch of the game against Italy. Less than two minutes into the game, Greenwell injured her knee, and was unable to continue. The USA team played on, now playing with just two players against three. Despite that, they managed to take the game to overtime, where they lost 21–19. This left them scheduled to play Japan for the bronze medal, but with only two players, the team forfeited due to injury. Officially, the USA team finished fourth, but FIBA awarded the team an honorary bronze medal.

U16 Americas 2011
Harper was named to the USA Basketball U16 team, which competed in the Second FIBA Americas U16 Championship in 2011, held in Mérida, Mexico. The team won all five contests, with an average margin of victory of 43 points per game. The win secured the gold medal for the competition, as well as an automatic bid to the Second FIBA U17 World Championship For Women – 2012 held in Amsterdam. Harper started all five games, averaging 9.6 points per game and leading the team in steals with 17.

U17 World 2012
Harper continued with the team as the U16 team became the U17 team and competed in the world championship event held in Amsterdam. The USA team won all eight contests to win the world championship and the gold-medal for the event. In the opening game against South Korea, Harper recorded five steals, at the time, a USA U17 record. In the game against Belgium, she recorded seven steals to set a new record. She was seven for seven from the free throw line in the game against Italy, tying a team record for free throw percentage. Harper played in all eight contests and averaged 7.9 points per game. She was named to the five player all-tournament team.

U19 team 2013
Harper was named to the USA Basketball U19 team, coached by Katie Meier, the head coach of the University of Miami. Among Plum's teammates were Moriah Jefferson and Breanna Stewart. Harper competed on behalf of the US at the Tenth FIBA U19 World Championship, held in Klaipeda and Panevežys, Lithuania, in July 2013.  The team won all nine games, with a winning margin averaging 43 points per game. Harper scored 8.4 points per game and recorded 18 steals, only one fewer than team leader Morgan Tuck.

Pan Am 2015
Harper was a member of the USA Women's Pan American Team which participated in basketball at the 2015 Pan American Games held in Toronto, Ontario, Canada July 10 to 26, 2015. The USA opened preliminary play with a game against Brazil. Although they opened up a 16-point lead in the second quarter Brazil came back, going on a 14–0 run to take a two-point lead in the third quarter. The USA responded with an 11–2 run with foul shot contributions by Jefferson and a three-point basket from Stewart. The USA ended up winning the close game 75–69.

The second game was against the Dominican Republic. USA scored the first eight points and was never threatened. USA won 94–55. Kelsey Plum led the team with five assists. The final preliminary game USA played Puerto Rico. USA led by only three points at the end of the third quarter, largely due to the play of Carla Cortijo Sanchez who scored 24 points, but left with an injury late in the game. After the injury the US extended the lead to 18 points and ended up with a 93–77 win, good for first place in their group.

In the semifinal game, Cuba led the US by as many as 14 points in the third quarter. The USA battled back and took a late lead. With under eight seconds to go, the USA was down by one point while Cuba had the ball. Harper stole the ball and made two free throws to give the USA the lead. Cuba missed its final shot to give the USA the win 65–64, propelling them into the gold-medal game against Canada.

The gold-medal game matched up the host team Canada against USA, in a sold-out arena dominated by fans in red and white and waving the Canadian flag. The Canadian team, arm in arm, sang Oh Canada as the respective national anthems were played.

After trading baskets early, the US edged out to a double-digit lead in the second quarter. However the Canadians, spurred on by the home crowd cheering, fought back and tied up the game at halftime. In the third quarter, it was Canada's time to shine as they outscored the US 26–15. The lead would reach as high as 18 points. The USA would fight back, but not all the way and Canada won the game and the gold-medal 81–73. It was Canada's first gold-medal in basketball in the Pan Am games. Nurse was the star for Canada with 33 points, hitting 11 of her 12 free-throw attempts in 10 of her 17 field-goal attempts including two of three three-pointers.

University of Kentucky career

Freshman year
Harper helped her team to a 26–9 record in her freshman year. She averaged 6.9 points per game during the season. In the SEC Tournament, the team made it to the finals, but fell short by a single point to Tennessee 71–70. Harper scored 12 points in the game. She was named to the SEC All-Tournament Team.

Sophomore year
Harper earned a starting position for 17 of the 34 games in her sophomore year. She stepped up her point production to eleven points per game. Despite being only 5' 8", she averaged 7.1 rebounds per game, good enough for seventh place in the SEC and the only player in the top ten under six feet tall. She is the only player in the nation 5' 8" or under to average more than seven rebounds per game. She earned a spot on the SEC All-Defensive Team. Harper decided to transfer before the start of her junior year.

Kentucky and Ohio State statistics

Source

WNBA career statistics

Regular season

|-
| align="left" | 2018
| align="left" | Chicago
| 24 || 0 || 6.1 || .404 || .308 || .600 || 0.8 || 1.0 || 0.2 || 0.0 || 0.4 || 2.0
|-
| align="left" | 2021
| align="left" | Minnesota
| 1 || 0 || 5.0 || .000 || .000 || .000 || 1.0 || 0.0 || 0.0 || 0.0 || 0.0 || 0.0
|-
| align="left" | Career
| align="left" | 2 years, 2 teams
| 25 || 0 || 6.0 || .404 || .308 || .600 || 0.8 || 1.0 || 0.2 || 0.0 || 0.4 || 1.9

Awards and honors
 2013 — McDonald's All America Team
 2013 — USA Today All-USA first team
 2013 — WBCA All America Team

References

1995 births
Living people
American women's 3x3 basketball players
American women's basketball players
Basketball players at the 2015 Pan American Games
Basketball players from Chicago
Chicago Sky players
Kentucky Wildcats women's basketball players
McDonald's High School All-Americans
Medalists at the 2015 Pan American Games
Minnesota Lynx players
Ohio State Buckeyes women's basketball players
Pan American Games medalists in basketball
Pan American Games silver medalists for the United States
Parade High School All-Americans (girls' basketball)
Point guards
Whitney M. Young Magnet High School alumni
United States women's national basketball team players